In the 2015–16 season, Partizan NIS Belgrade competed in the Basketball League of Serbia, the Radivoj Korać Cup and the Adriatic League.

Players

Roster

Roster changes

In

Out

Pre-season and friendlies

Competitions

Adriatic League

Standings

Regular season

Kup Radivoja Koraća

Quarterfinals

Semifinals

Final

References

External links
 Official website

KK Partizan seasons
Partizan
Partizan